Andrew or Andy Douglas may refer to:
 Andrew Douglas (director), British director
 Andrew Douglas (photographer) (born 1952), British photographer
 Andrew Douglas (rugby union), New Zealand rugby union coach
 Andrew Douglas (squash player) (born 1998), American squash player
 Andrew Douglas of Hermiston, medieval Scottish nobleman
 Andrew Halliday Douglas (1819–1908), Scottish physician
 Andrew Snape Douglas (1761–1797), Scottish sea captain in the Royal Navy
 Andy Douglas (judge) (1932–2021), former Republican justice of the Ohio Supreme Count
 Andy Douglas (wrestler) (born 1978), retired American professional wrestler

See also
 A. E. Douglass (1867–1962), American astronomer
 Andrew Douglas-Home (born 1950), Scottish former first-class cricketer
 Andrew Douglas Maclagan (1812–1900), Scottish surgeon
 Andrew Douglas Young (1881–1950), Australian accountant and stockbroker